Chester B. Scrignar (died May 24, 2007) was an American forensic psychiatrist. He was a Clininal Professor of Psychiatry and Neurology at the Tulane University School of Medicine, and the author of four books. According to The Arizona Republic, he was "a pioneer in behavior therapy and post-traumatic stress disorder."

Selected works

References

2007 deaths
Arizona State University alumni
Tulane University School of Medicine alumni
Tulane University faculty
American forensic psychiatrists